was a Japanese hurdler. He competed in the men's 110 metres hurdles at the 1936 Summer Olympics. He later served as a member of the board of directors of the Japan Association of Athletics Federations.

References

1914 births
2008 deaths
Place of birth missing
Japanese male hurdlers
Japanese male triple jumpers
Olympic male hurdlers
Olympic athletes of Japan
Athletes (track and field) at the 1936 Summer Olympics
Japan Championships in Athletics winners
20th-century Japanese people